Four ships of the French Navy have borne the name of Aconit (meaning Aconite):
 The , of the Free French Forces, which dispatched two German submarines within a few hours during the Second World War
 An , built in the United States, launched in 1953. She was sold to Tunisia as Sousse in 1966, and scrapped in 1988
 The only frigate of the F65 type, built in 1968 and commissioned in 1973. She was a prototype of the F67 type frigates. She was decommissioned in 1996
 The  stealth frigate , presently in service

French Navy ship names